The Nigerian National War Museum in Umuahia showcases the military history of Nigeria with relics form the Biafra-Nigerian Civil War. it has a collection of tanks, AFLs, ships and aircraft all from Nigeria or Biafra. Almost all tanks and AFLs are Biafran and all aircraft are Nigerian.It holds in it the evidence of the internal war  in Nigeria from 1967 to 1970 .The museum is a heritage site that captures the memories of the Biafra War

Collection

PT boats 
 NNS Bonny, at

Aircraft 
 Il-28
 Mig-17
 Do-27
 Do-28

Tanks/AFL's/Artillery 

 Biafra Red devil type A4
 Oguta Boy (Panhard AML)
 Alvis Saladin
 Artillery Gun 105mm (Czechoslovakian upgrade of 10.5 cm leFH 18/40)
 Ogbunigwe Launcher
 Ferret armoured car
 Bazooka anti-tank gun

Gallery

References 

Military and war museums
Museums in Nigeria
Umuahia
Buildings and structures in Abia State